Mayte Michelle Rodríguez (born July 12, 1978), better known by her stage name , is an American actress. Rodriguez began her career in 2000, playing a troubled boxer in the independent sports drama film Girlfight (2000), where she won the Independent Spirit Award and Gotham Award for Best Debut Performance. Rodriguez then began starring as Letty Ortiz in the Fast & Furious franchise, and portrayed Rain Ocampo in the Resident Evil franchise. She appeared in the crime thriller S.W.A.T. (2003), and later starred in James Cameron's science fiction epic Avatar (2009) and in the action film Battle: Los Angeles (2011).

After portraying Minerva Mirabal in the biopic Trópico de Sangre (2010), Rodriguez headlined the exploitation films Machete (2010) and Machete Kills (2013), and starred in the computer animated comedy films Turbo (2013) and Smurfs: The Lost Village (2017), while her performance in the heist film Widows (2018) was critically praised.

Outside of film, Rodriguez played Ana Lucia Cortez in the drama television series Lost (2005–2006; 2009–2010), and voiced Liz Ricarro in the English-language translation of the anime Immortal Grand Prix (2005–2006). She reprised her roles in video game spin-offs of Avatar and Fast & Furious, and also appeared in True Crime: Streets of LA (2003), Driver 3 (2004), Halo 2 (2004), and Call of Duty: Black Ops II (2012).

Early life
Mayte Michelle Rodriguez was born on July 12, 1978, in San Antonio, Texas. Her mother, Carmen Milady Rodriguez (née Pared Espinal), is Dominican, while her father, Rafael Rodriguez, was Puerto Rican and served in the U.S. Army. Rodriguez moved to the Dominican Republic with her mother when she was eight years old, and lived there until age 11. Later, she moved to Puerto Rico until the age of 17, and finally settled in Jersey City, New Jersey. She dropped out of William L. Dickinson High School, but later earned her GED. In total, she was expelled from five schools. She briefly attended business school before quitting to pursue a career in acting, with the ultimate goal of becoming a screenwriter and director. Rodriguez has 10 siblings and half-siblings. She was partly raised by her devoutly religious maternal grandmother, and was brought up as a Jehovah's Witness (her mother's religion), although she has since abandoned the faith. A DNA test of Rodriguez, performed by the television program Finding Your Roots, found that her ancestry is 72.4% European, 21.3% African, and 6.3% Native American. She also stated on the show that there was some racial conflict between her families, since her Puerto Rican father had a light complexion, and her Dominican mother had a dark complexion.

Career

Film and television

Having run across an ad for an open casting call and attending her first audition, Rodriguez beat 350 other applicants to win her first role in the low-budget 2000 independent film Girlfight. With her performance as Diana Guzman, a troubled teen who decides to channel her aggression by training to become a boxer, Rodriguez accumulated several awards and nominations for the role in independent circles, including major acting accolades from the National Board of Review, Deauville Film Festival, Independent Spirit Awards, Gotham Awards, Las Vegas Film Critics Sierra Awards, and many others. The film itself took home a top prize at the Sundance and won Award of the Youth at the Cannes Film Festival.

Rodriguez has had notable roles in other successful movies, including Letty in The Fast and the Furious (2001) and Rain Ocampo in Resident Evil (2002). She appeared in Blue Crush and S.W.A.T. In 2004, Rodriguez lent her voice to the video game Halo 2, playing a Marine. She provided the voice of Liz Ricarro in the Cartoon Network series IGPX. From 2005 to 2006, she played tough cop Ana Lucia Cortez on the television series Lost during the show's second season (the character's first appearance was a flashback during the first season's finale, "Exodus: Part 1"), and returned for a cameo in the second episode of the show's fifth season, "The Lie", in 2009. She returned again in the penultimate episode of the series, "What They Died For", in 2010. In 2006, Rodriguez was featured in her own episode of G4's show Icons.

In 2008, Rodriguez appeared in the political drama Battle in Seattle opposite Charlize Theron and Woody Harrelson. In 2009, she appeared in Fast & Furious, the fourth installment of The Fast and the Furious film series. Later that year, Rodriguez starred in James Cameron's science fiction adventure epic Avatar, which became the highest-grossing film in history and Rodriguez's most successful film to date. In 2009, Rodriguez starred in Trópico de Sangre, an independent film based on the Dominican Republic's historic Mirabal sisters.

In 2010, Rodriguez appeared in Robert Rodriguez's Machete. In 2011, she appeared with Aaron Eckhart in the science fiction film Battle: Los Angeles. In 2012, she returned to play the good clone and bad clone of Rain Ocampo in Resident Evil: Retribution. In 2013, she reprised her roles as Letty in Fast & Furious 6 and Luz / Shé in the Robert Rodriguez sequel Machete Kills. She also voiced a character in DreamWorks Animation's Turbo.

In 2015, she appeared in Furious 7. In 2016 she starred in The Assignment alongside Sigourney Weaver. In 2017, she lent her voice to Smurfs: The Lost Village. She starred in The Fate of the Furious, which broke records for the largest global box office opening of all-time. In 2018, she starred opposite Viola Davis in Widows from director Steve McQueen, and in 2019 reunited with director James Cameron on the film Alita: Battle Angel. Rodriguez started Cheshire Kat Productions, a production company that produced the documentary Stuntwomen: The Untold Hollywood Story (2019).

Screenwriting
As of 2013, Rodriguez stated she was working on several projects, including a family adventure film, a drug drama, and a female-oriented period piece.

Personal life

Rodriguez's hobbies include tactical gun training, skydiving, and DJing.

In early 2000, Rodriguez broke off an engagement to a Muslim boyfriend, citing opposition to religious requests he made of her. In 2001, she reportedly dated her Fast & Furious co-star Vin Diesel.

In 2013, Entertainment Weekly quoted her as saying: "I've gone both ways. I do as I please. I am too curious to sit here and not try when I can. Men are intriguing. So are chicks." As she explained to Latina magazine: "I'm getting older. Eventually it's going to wrinkle up and I'm not going to be able to use it. I wanted to be honest about who I am and see what happens." The following year, she said in an interview that she hoped her actions would help others in a similar situation: "Maybe by me opening my big fat mouth like I usually do and stepping up and owning who I am, maybe it might inspire somebody else to do the same." She described herself as bisexual in another interview later that month: "Bi, yeah, I fall under the B-category of LGBT." Regarding the lack of unconventional female roles available in films, she said: "What's wrong with being bi? I mean, we're getting flak everywhere we go."

Legal issues
In March 2002, Rodriguez was arrested for assault after getting into a fight with her roommate. The charges were later dropped after the roommate declined to press the allegations in court.

In November 2003, Rodriguez went to court to face eight misdemeanor-charges based on two driving-incidents, including a hit and run and driving under the influence (DUI). In June 2004, Rodriguez pleaded no contest in Los Angeles to three of the charges: Hit and run; drunken driving; and driving with a suspended license. She went to jail for 48 hours, performed community service at the morgues of two New York hospitals, completed a three-month alcohol program, and was placed on probation for three years.

In 2005, while filming Lost in Hawaii, Rodriguez was pulled over by Honolulu police multiple times for speeding-violations, and on December 1 was arrested for DUI. In April 2006, she pleaded guilty to one charge of driving under the influence, and chose to pay a  fine and spend five days in jail.

Rodriguez cited her high doses of allergy-relieving steroids one of the reasons for her erratic behavior. Because the incident was a violation of her Los Angeles probation, she was sentenced to 60days in jail, a 30-day alcohol rehabilitation program, and another 30days of community service, including work for Mothers Against Drunk Driving. Because of overcrowding, she was released from jail on the same day she entered.

In September 2007, Rodriguez allegedly violated her probation by neither completing her community service nor following an alcohol education program. On October 10, 2007, following a hearing, she was sentenced to 180days jail time after agreeing to admit to violating her probation. She was expected to spend the full 180-day term in jail but was released 18 days later due to overcrowding. In January 2009, Rodriguez completed her community service.

Filmography

Film

Television

Video games

Music videos

Theme park ride

Awards and nominations

Notes

References

External links

1978 births
Living people
20th-century American actresses
21st-century American actresses
Actresses from Jersey City, New Jersey
Actresses from San Antonio
American film actresses
American prisoners and detainees
American television actresses
American video game actresses
American voice actresses
Bisexual actresses
Former Jehovah's Witnesses
American actresses of Puerto Rican descent
American people of Dominican Republic descent
LGBT people from Texas
LGBT Hispanic and Latino American people
William L. Dickinson High School alumni
Hispanic and Latino American actresses
American bisexual actors